Alexander Wadsworth may refer to:
 Alexander S. Wadsworth, United States Navy officer
 Alexander Wadsworth (landscape designer), American landscape architect and surveyor

See also
 Alexander Wadsworth Longfellow Jr., American architect